Yves Perron  is a Canadian politician, who was elected to the House of Commons of Canada in the 2019 election. He represents the electoral district of Berthier—Maskinongé as a member of the Bloc Québécois. Perron also serves as President of the party.

Political career
In his first attempt to become Member of Parliament for Berthier—Maskinongé, in 2015, Perron came second to New Democratic Party incumbent Ruth Ellen Brosseau with 25.8% of the vote.

Between 2015 and 2019, he was actively involved in the Quebec independence movement, as regional president of the Parti Québécois for Lanaudière between 2016 and 2018, as well as serving as riding president of the Bloc Québécois in Berthier—Maskinongé.

Following the leadership crisis of Martine Ouellet as head of the Bloc Québécois, he became national president of the Bloc Québécois.

Electoral record

References

External links

Bloc Québécois MPs
Members of the House of Commons of Canada from Quebec
Year of birth missing (living people)
Living people
People from Lanaudière